Kosmos 133 (meaning "Kosmos 133"), Soyuz 7K-OK No.2, was the first uncrewed test flight of the Soyuz spacecraft, and first mission of the Soyuz programme, as part of the Soviet space programme.

Launch 
Launched from the Baikonur Cosmodrome aboard the maiden flight of the Soyuz 11A511 s/n U15000-02 launch vehicle. Kosmos 133 was planned "all up" test, to include an automated docking with a second Soyuz spacecraft (Soyuz 7K-OK No.1), which was scheduled for launch the day after Kosmos 133.

Mission 

Return 
Problems found during ground testing of the second spacecraft resulted in its launch being delayed, and it was destroyed when its launch vehicle exploded on its launch pad following a scrubbed launch attempt in December 1966. Before this, the attitude control system (ACS) of Kosmos 133 malfunctioned, resulting in rapid consumption of orientation fuel, leaving it spinning at 2 rpm. After large efforts by ground control and 5 attempts at retrofire over two days, the craft was finally coming down for a landing. Due to the inaccuracy of the reentry burn, it was determined that the capsule would land in China. The self-destruct command was given and the satellite exploded 30 November 1966 at 10:21 GMT.

The fireball passed over west Japan and was recorded by photos and a sketch. Kōichirō Tomita identified that it was the Kosmos 133 spacecraft (30 November 1966).

References 

Kosmos satellites
Soyuz uncrewed test flights
1966 in the Soviet Union
Spacecraft launched in 1966